Real Pajonal  is a Salvadoran professional football club based in San Antonio Pajonal, Santa Ana Department, El Salvador.

The club currently plays in the Tercera Division de Fútbol Salvadoreño. 

The club was founded in 2001.

Honours

Leagues 
La Asociación Departamental de Fútbol Aficionado and predecessors (4th tier)
Champions (1): 2015

Captain
 Rene Garcia (2018)

List of Coaches
  Antonio Garcia Prieto

References

Real Pajonal